Karakoçan is a village in the Karakoçan District of Elazığ Province in Turkey. Its population is 25 (2021). The village is populated by Kurds. It lies about 11 km northeast of the town Karakoçan.

References

Villages in Karakoçan District
Kurdish settlements in Elazığ Province